Marlow Run is a  long 1st order tributary to Middle Wheeling Creek in Ohio County, West Virginia.

Course 
Marlow Run rises about 2 miles southeast of Roneys Point, West Virginia, and then flows southeast to join Middle Wheeling Creek about 4 miles southeast of Roneys Point.

Watershed 
Marlow Run drains  of area, receives about 41.1 in/year of precipitation, has a wetness index of 273.33, and is about 72% forested.

See also 
 List of rivers of West Virginia

References 

Rivers of Ohio County, West Virginia
Rivers of West Virginia